Niche blogging is the act of creating a blog with the intent of using it to market to a particular niche market. Niche blogs (also commonly referred to as "niche websites") may appeal to "geographic areas, a speciality industry, ethnic or age groups, or any other particular group of people." While there is also debate that every blog is, in some form, a niche blog, the term as it applies to marketing refers to a particular kind of blog.

Neither blogging nor niche marketing is a new concept. However, only in recent years has the concept of a niche blog come into being.

Usually, niche blogs will contain affiliate links or advertisements of some sort (pay-per-click or products or both). In some cases, the purpose of the niche blog is to invite the reader into visiting another website which may then attempt to sell the reader a product or service.

Niche blogging and spam blogging are often hard to distinguish. However, niche blogging's reliance on pay-per-click advertising and other revenue streams usually requires blogs to have valuable content related to their chosen niche, unlike a splog.

Popularity
The popularity of niche blogging among new marketers can be attributed to several factors, including cost, adaptability and generating traffic.

Cost
Blogging can be a low-cost operation using free hosting platforms, including WordPress, Blogger and Tumblr. Bloggers who choose to invest may purchase domain names or self-host their blogs for a cost. Self-hosted blogs are popular, as Google also takes a website's speed as a ranking factor; therefore, SEOs recommend web admins to host their blogs on high-quality servers.

Effectiveness 
As far as company-run websites go, niche blogs are an effective marketing tool due to their less sale-oriented nature. By providing useful content for users, rather than just pitching sales, niche blogs encourage product and brand awareness, and are therefore popular in a range of industries as an addition to company websites.

Audience targeting 
Niche bloggers generate revenue by targeting readers in their niche, whether that be a group of fellow professionals in a business or potential clients. The choice of target audience influences which topics bloggers choose to cover and how they present and promote their writings.

Profitability 
If built correctly, niche blogs can provide their bloggers with a pleasant revenue. From just some extra income to help pay monthly bills to generous amounts that can replace their full-time job salary or overtake it entirely. The reason is that this kind of blogs targets a specific type of audience that is closer to the final stage of the purchase funnel.

References

Blogging